The 1983 United Kingdom general election was held on Thursday 9 June 1983. It gave the Conservative Party under the leadership of Margaret Thatcher the most decisive election victory since that of the Labour Party in 1945, with a majority of 144 seats and the first of two consecutive landslide victories.

Thatcher's first term as Prime Minister had not been an easy time. Unemployment increased during the first three years of her premiership and the economy went through a recession. However, the British victory in the Falklands War led to a recovery of her personal popularity, and economic growth had begun to resume.

By the time Thatcher called the election in May 1983, opinion polls pointed to a Conservative victory, with most national newspapers backing the re-election of the Conservative government. The resulting win earned the Conservatives their biggest parliamentary majority of the post-war era, and their second-biggest majority as a majority government, behind only the 1924 general election (they earned even more seats in the 1931 general election, but were part of the National Government).

The Labour Party had been led by Michael Foot since the resignation of former Prime Minister James Callaghan as Leader of the Labour Party in 1980, and its new policies were considered more left-wing than before. Several "moderate" Labour MPs had defected from the party to form the Social Democratic Party (SDP), which then formed the SDP–Liberal Alliance with the existing Liberal Party. Labour was further harmed by its promise to withdraw from the European Economic Community, which alienated Pro-European groups.

The opposition vote split almost evenly between the Alliance and Labour. With its worst electoral performance since 1931, the Labour vote fell by over 3,000,000 votes from 1979, accounting for both a national swing of almost 4% towards the Conservatives and their larger parliamentary majority of 144 seats, even though the Conservatives' total vote fell by almost 700,000. This was the last general election until 2015 in which a governing party increased its number of seats.

The Alliance finished in third place but came within 700,000 votes of out-polling Labour; by gaining 25.4% of the vote it won the largest percentage for any third party since 1923. Despite this, it won only 23 seats, whereas Labour won 209. The Liberals argued that a proportional electoral system would have given them a more representative number of MPs. Changing the electoral system from First-Past-The-Post had been a long-running campaign plank of the Liberal Party and would later be adopted by its successor, the Liberal Democrats.

The election night was broadcast live on the BBC and was presented by David Dimbleby, Sir Robin Day and Peter Snow. It was also broadcast on ITV and presented by Alastair Burnet, Peter Sissons and Martyn Lewis.

Three future leaders of the Labour Party (Tony Blair (1994–2007), Gordon Brown (2007–2010) and Jeremy Corbyn (2015–2020)) were first elected at this election. At the same time, a number of prominent Members of Parliament stepped aside or lost their seats. Former Labour Prime Minister Harold Wilson stood down from Parliament after 38 years, while the Alliance's Shirley Williams and Bill Pitt lost their seats only a short time after winning them. Joan Lestor and Tony Benn as well as Speaker of the House of Commons and former Labour Cabinet Minister George Thomas also departed from Parliament at this election, although Benn would return after winning a by-election in Chesterfield the following year, and Lestor returned to Parliament after winning a seat at the next general election in 1987. In addition, two future Leaders of the Liberal Democrats were first elected —Paddy Ashdown and Charles Kennedy. Michael Howard, who later served the Conservatives as Home Secretary in government and as party leader from 2003 to 2005, was also elected to Parliament in 1983.

Background and campaign
Michael Foot was elected leader of the Labour Party at the end of 1980, replacing James Callaghan. The election of Foot signalled that the core of the party was swinging to the left and the move exacerbated divisions within the party. During 1981, a group of senior figures including Roy Jenkins, David Owen, Bill Rodgers and Shirley Williams left Labour to found the Social Democratic Party (SDP). The SDP agreed to a pact with the Liberals for the 1983 election and stood as "The Alliance". For a while the Alliance topped the opinion polls and looked capable of achieving their goal of forming a coalition government at the next general election, but the success of the Falklands campaign in 1982 saw the political tide turn in favour of the Conservative government.

The election did not have to be held until 1984. Although political circumstances were clearly favourable for the government and opposition parties anticipated that Mrs Thatcher would go to the country in June, earlier in 1983 the Conservatives were split on the timing of the election. One faction favoured a June election, but another group wanted to wait until October before going to the country, while some within the Party even advocated delaying the contest until 1984. Supporters of waiting to a later time to hold an election included Thatcher's deputy and Home Secretary Willie Whitelaw and John Biffen who was then serving as Leader of the House of Commons. On 27 April it was reported that all the Conservative party's regional agents had unanimously  expressed a preference to Thatcher for a June election, although some members of her cabinet were advising her to wait until October. On 8 May senior Conservatives met at Chequers and agreed to go to the country on 9 June. The election was formally called the next day and Parliament was dissolved on 13 May for a four-week official election campaign.

The campaign displayed the huge divisions between the two major parties. Thatcher had been highly unpopular during her first two years in office until the swift and decisive victory in the Falklands War, coupled with an improving economy, considerably raised her standings in the polls. The Conservatives' key issues included reducing unemployment (which had increased from 1.5 million in 1979 to more than 3 million by 1982), continuing economic growth following the recent recession, and defence. Labour's campaign manifesto involved leaving the European Economic Community, abolishing the House of Lords, abandoning the United Kingdom's nuclear deterrent by cancelling Trident and removing cruise missiles — a programme dubbed by Labour MP Gerald Kaufman "the longest suicide note in history"; "Although, at barely 37 pages, it only seemed interminable", noted Roy Hattersley. Pro-Labour political journalist Michael White, writing in The Guardian, commented: "There was something magnificently brave about Michael Foot's campaign but it was like the Battle of the Somme."

The Alliance had had a setback ahead of the campaign at the Darlington by-election in March. The contest was one that had looked promising ground for the SDP, but despite heavily campaigning in the Labour-held seat, the SDP candidate, who struggled when interviewed for television by Vincent Hanna finished a poor third, which stalled the momentum of the Alliance. During the campaign, on Sunday 29 May, David Steel held a meeting with Jenkins and other Alliance leaders at his Ettrickbridge home. Steel, who polls showed was more popular proposed that Jenkins take a lower profile and that Steel take over as leader of the campaign. Jenkins rejected Steel's view and remained "Prime Minister designate", but Steel did have a heightened role on television for the last 10 days of the election campaign. According to Steve Richards the meeting meant Jenkins' "confidence was undermined and he staggered to the finishing line with less verve than he had displayed in the early days of the SDP" and showed little sign of his earlier "exuberance".

Notional election, 1979

Following boundary changes in 1983, the BBC and ITN (Independent Television News) co-produced a calculation of how the 1979 general election would have gone if fought on the new 1983 boundaries. The following table shows the effects of the boundary changes on the House of Commons:  

|}

Timeline

Results

The election saw the Conservatives win a landslide victory, improving on their 1979 result and achieving their best results since 1935. Although there was a slight drop in their share of the vote, they made significant gains at the expense of Labour. The Tories have yet to match their 1983-seat total in any subsequent general election, although they recorded a higher share of the popular vote in 2019.

The night was a disaster for the Labour Party; their share of the vote fell by over 9%, which meant they were only 700,000 votes ahead of the newly formed third party, the SDP–Liberal Alliance. The massive increase of support for the Alliance at the expense of Labour meant that, in many seats, the collapse in the Labour vote allowed the Conservatives to gain. Despite winning over 25% of the national vote, the Alliance got fewer than 4% of seats, 186 fewer than Labour. The most significant Labour loss of the night was Tony Benn, who was defeated in the revived Bristol East seat. SDP President Shirley Williams, then a prominent leader in the Social Democratic Party, lost her Crosby seat which she had won in a by-election in 1981. Bill Rodgers, another leading figure in the Alliance (like Williams, one of the "Gang of Four") also failed to win his old seat that he previously held as a Labour MP.

In Scotland, both Labour and the Conservatives sustained modest losses to the Alliance. Labour remained by far the largest party, with 41 seats to 21 for the Scottish Conservatives. The Scottish Conservatives have been unable to match their 1983 Westminster seat total since, although they did record a slightly larger share of the Scottish vote in 2017, by which time the Scottish National Party had become the dominant party in Scotland with the Conservatives being the largest unionist party, with 13 seats won in 2017; their strongest performance in Scotland in 34 years.

On a nationwide basis, the 1983 UK general election was the worst result in Labour's modern history until the 2019 general election, in terms of seats won. The result in 1983 remains the worst-ever modern performance for Labour in England.

:

|-
|+ style="caption-side: bottom; font-weight:normal" |All parties with more than 500 votes shown.
|}

Votes summary

Seats summary

Incumbents defeated

Tables of target seats

Conservative targets

Labour targets
To regain an overall majority, Labour needed to make at least 65 gains.

SDP–Liberal Alliance targets

See also
 List of MPs elected in the 1983 United Kingdom general election
 1983 United Kingdom general election in Northern Ireland
 1983 United Kingdom general election in England
 1983 United Kingdom general election in Wales
 1983 United Kingdom local elections

Notes

References

Further reading

Manifestos
 The Challenge of Our Times, 1983 Conservative Party manifesto
 The New Hope for Britain, 1983 Labour Party manifesto
 Working Together for Britain, 1983 SDP–Liberal Alliance manifesto

 
1983
General election
General election
Margaret Thatcher
Michael Foot